Alexander Murdoch (25 June 1875 – 13 June 1958) was an Australian rules footballer who played for the Melbourne Football Club in the Victorian Football League (VFL).

Notes

External links 
	

1875 births
Australian rules footballers from Victoria (Australia)
Melbourne Football Club players
1958 deaths